In applied mathematics, a number is normalized when it is written in scientific notation with one non-zero decimal digit before the decimal point. Thus, a real number, when written out in normalized scientific notation, is as follows:

That is, its leading digit (i.e., leftmost) is not zero and is followed by the decimal point. Simply speaking, a number is normalized when it is written in the form of a × 10n where 1 ≤ a < 10 without leading zeros in a. This is the standard form of scientific notation. An alternative style is to have the first non-zero digit after the decimal point.

Examples
As examples, the number 918.082 in normalized form is 

while the number  in normalized form is

Clearly, any non-zero real number can be normalized.

Other bases
The same definition holds if the number is represented in another radix (that is, base of enumeration), rather than base 10. 

In base b a normalized number will have the form

In many computer systems, binary floating-point numbers are represented internally using this normalized form for their representations; for details, see normal number (computing). Although the point is described as floating, for a normalized floating-point number, its position is fixed, the movement being reflected in the different values of the power.

See also
Significand

References

Computer arithmetic